
Year 609 (DCIX) was a common year starting on Wednesday (link will display the full calendar) of the Julian calendar. The denomination 609 for this year has been used since the early medieval period, when the Anno Domini calendar era became the prevalent method in Europe for naming years.

Events 
 By place 

 Byzantine Empire 
 Nicetas, cousin of future emperor Heraclius, launches an overland invasion in Egypt. He defeats a Byzantine army under Bonus (comes Orientis) outside Alexandria, sent from Constantinople.

 Persia 
 Battle of Dhi Qar: Arab tribesmen of Bakr ibn Wa'il defeat a Persian force (5,000 men), at a watering place near Kufa (Southern Iraq).

 Asia 
 Emperor Yángdi completes the Grand Canal; it provides an unbroken inland ship transport between the Yellow and Yangtze rivers. The canal network is 1,776 km (1,400 miles) long—linking five river systems—and extends from Beijing to the city of Hangzhou.  
 The Sui Dynasty government records a tax census of roughly 9 million registered households in the Chinese Empire, a population size of roughly 50 million people.
 Shibi Khan becomes the ninth ruler (khagan) of the Eastern Turkic Khaganate (approximate date).

 By topic 

 Religion 
 May 13 – The Pantheon in Rome is consecrated as "St. Mary and the Martyrs" (informally known as "Santa Maria Rotonda") by Pope Boniface IV (or 610).
 December 22 – Muhammad claims to have received what was to become the first wahy of Islam.

Births 
 Audoin, bishop of Rouen (d. 686)
 Hafsa bint Umar, wife of Muhammad (approximate date)

Deaths 
 Qamishoʿ, Syriac Orthodox Grand Metropolitan of the East.
 Venantius Fortunatus, Latin poet and bishop (or 600)
 Yang Lihua, empress of Northern Zhou (b. 561)
 Zuhayr bin Abi Sulma, Arabian poet (approx.)

References

Sources